Lymantria marginata is a moth of the family Erebidae first described by Francis Walker in 1855. It is found in India, Bangladesh, Sri Lanka and Thailand.

The wingspan of the male is 41 mm and the female is about 52 mm. Palpi porrect (extending forward) and hairy. Sexes show sexual dimorphism. Antennae of male bipectinate (comb like on both sides) with long branches and female has pectinate (comb like on one side) antennae. Male with head and thorax pale fuscous with black spots. There is a line which runs behind the head. Head yellowish. Two orange spots found on mesothorax. Female has white forewings with black patches. Abdomen orange with a black line on vertex. Anal tuft black. The caterpillar is a serious pest on Mangifera indica and Durio zibethinus.

References

External links
Biometrical analysis on head-body appendages during larval growth of Lymantria marginata
Studi Biologi Ulat Bulu Lymantria marginata Wlk. (Lepidoptera: Lymantridae) Pada Tanaman Mangga
Feature in sexing and loss in weight of the pupae of Lymantria marginata
Influence of age and stage of the host plant on insect pests of mango

Lymantria
Moths of Asia
Moths described in 1855